The Central Hinds are the women's representative cricket team of the Central Districts Cricket Association, based in central New Zealand. They play their home games at Pukekura Park, New Plymouth, Fitzherbert Park, Palmerston North, Saxton Oval, Nelson and other CDCA home venues. They compete in the Hallyburton Johnstone Shield  one-day competition and the Women's Super Smash Twenty20 competition.

History
The Central Districts Cricket Association comprises eight District associations: Hawke's Bay, Horowhenua-Kapiti, Manawatu, Taranaki, Wairarapa and Wanganui in the North Island, and Marlborough and Nelson in the South Island.

Central Districts joined the Hallyburton Johnstone Shield for the 1979–80 season and finished fourth with one win and three draws. In 1982–83, they finished second for the first time, behind Canterbury, who dominated the period.

Central Districts won their first title in 2005–06 (when the one-day competition was named the State League), finishing second in the group stage before beating Canterbury in the final, helped by three wickets from Zara McWilliams and 55* from Sara McGlashan. They were runners-up in 2007–08 before winning their second one-day competition in 2009–10, with the final rained-off and therefore winning the title as they had topped the group stage. They also won their only Super Smash title the same season, beating Auckland in the final by eight wickets. 

Central Districts won their third one-day title in 2018–19, topping the group stage before beating Auckland in the final. Central Districts batter Natalie Dodd was the leading run-scorer in the competition, with 652 runs.

Grounds
Central Districts' first primary home ground was Manawaroa Park, Palmerston North, with some matches played at Ongley Park in the same city.

In the 1990s, the side began playing at Victoria Park, Whanganui, as well as Fitzherbert Park in Palmerston North. In 1998, Central Districts began playing in Napier, especially at Nelson Park, but also later at McLean Park. From the 2000s, their primary grounds were Pukekura Park, New Plymouth and Fitzherbert Park, along with stints at grounds such as Queen Elizabeth Park and Cornwall Park, Hastings. In 2020–21, Central Districts primarily used Pukekura Park, as well as McLean Park for two matches with Super Smash matches being played as double-headers with the men's team, the Central Stags for the third consecutive season. 

In 2021–22, the side used Saxton Oval, Nelson for the first time, as well as returning to Donnelly Park, McLean Park and Fitzherbert Park. In 2022–23, the side continued to use Saxton Oval and Fitzherbert Park, as well as Pukekura Park.

Players

Current squad
Based on players for the 2022–23 season.
Players in bold have international caps.

Notable players
Players who have played for Central Districts and played internationally are listed below, in order of first international appearance (given in brackets):

 Viv Sexton (1978)
 Linda Fraser (1982)
 Di Caird (1984)
 Rose Signal (1984)
 Liz Signal (1984)
 Jackie Clark (1984)
 Penny Kinsella (1988)
 Trudy Anderson (1993)
 Karen Musson (1993)
 Delwyn Brownlee (1995)
 Clare Connor (1995)
 Helen Daly (1996)
 Rebecca Rolls (1997)
 Rachel Pullar (1997)
 Kate Pulford (1999)
 Donna Trow (1999)
 Hannah Lloyd (1999)
 Paula Gruber (2000)
 Erin McDonald (2000)
 Emily Travers (2000)
 Aimee Watkins (2002)
 Sara McGlashan (2003)
 Eimear Richardson (2005)
 Rachel Priest (2007)
 Rachel Candy (2007)
 Abby Burrows (2009)
 Natalie Dodd (2010)
 Kate Ebrahim (2010)
 Liz Perry (2010)
 Esther Lanser (2010)
 Kerry-Anne Tomlinson (2011)
 Hannah Rowe (2015)
 Jess Watkin (2018)
 Priyanaz Chatterji (2018)
 Rosemary Mair (2019)
 Rebecca Burns (2022)

Players who have played for Central Districts and played internationally in sports other than cricket are listed below:
 Kendra Cocksedge - rugby union
 Liz Perry - field hockey double international
 Rebecca Rolls - association football double international

Coaching staff

Head coach: Jamie Watkins

Honours
 Hallyburton Johnstone Shield:
 Winners (3): 2005–06, 2009–10, 2018–19
 Women's Super Smash:
 Winners (1): 2009–10

See also
 Central Districts cricket team

References

Women's cricket teams in New Zealand
Cricket in Central Districts
Super Smash (cricket)